was a Japanese Nippon Professional Baseball pitcher, originally from Okayama, Okayama. He played with the Taiyo Whales. He is a member of the Japanese Baseball Hall of Fame.

References

External links

1934 births
2000 deaths
Sportspeople from Okayama
Japanese Baseball Hall of Fame inductees
Japanese baseball players
Taiyō Whales players
Nippon Professional Baseball Rookie of the Year Award winners
Nippon Professional Baseball MVP Award winners
Managers of baseball teams in Japan
Yokohama DeNA BayStars managers